Zumba Fitness is a video game developed by Pipeworks Software and published by Majesco Entertainment based on the Zumba program. It is available for Wii, PlayStation 3 with PlayStation Move, and Xbox 360 with Kinect. The Wii and PS3 versions come with a Zumba Belt where the Wii Remote or Move controller is inserted into on the right hip. The game was released in November 2010.

Gameplay

The game supports up to four players on Wii and PlayStation Move, up to two players on Kinect, locally, and up to eight players online on PlayStation Move and Kinect.

Sequel

Due to successful sales of the game, Majesco has scheduled a second game for the Wii which was released on November 15, 2011. The second game adds music tracks by popular artists such as Pitbull and Nicole Scherzinger.

Instructors

Gina, Tanya and Beto are the Zumba Fitness Instructors. Gina for the Beginner Level, Tanya for the Intermediate Levels, and Beto for the Expert Levels and the Zumbathon.

References

External links
Press release

2010 video games
Dance video games
Fitness games
Kinect games
Majesco Entertainment games
Multiplayer online games
Music video games
PlayStation 3 games
PlayStation Move-compatible games
Unreal Engine games
Video games developed in the United States
Wii Balance Board games
Wii MotionPlus games
Wii Speak games
Wii games
Xbox 360 games
Multiplayer and single-player video games
505 Games games
Pipeworks Studios games